William Edward Spriggs (born 1955) is an American economist who worked as chair of the Howard University Department of Economics from 2005 to 2009 and assistant secretary of labor for policy from 2009 to 2012. He is also a professor of economics at Howard University and chief economist for the AFL-CIO.

Spriggs' work and research focuses on workforce discrimination, minimum wage, national and international labor standards, and pay equity. He supports organized labor and liberal economics. Spriggs has been mentioned as a potential United States secretary of labor or member of the Federal Reserve Board of Governors.

Early life and education
Spriggs was born in Washington D.C. His father was a Tuskegee Airman who held a PhD in physics and worked as a professor. His mother was a World War II veteran and school teacher.

Spriggs attended public elementary schools in northeast and southeast Washington D.C. at the same time his mother was finishing her college degree.

After high school, Spriggs earned a Bachelor of Arts degree in economics and political science from Williams College. He continued onto graduate school on a National Science Foundation Minority Graduate Fellowship. He attended the University of Wisconsin–Madison, where he earned his Master of Arts (1979) and PhD (1984), both in economics. His doctoral dissertation focused on the accumulation of wealth by African Americans in Virginia between 1900 and 1914. He earned the National Economic Association's 1985 dissertation prize for his work. During this time, he also served as a co-president of the American Federation of Teachers Local 3220.

Career

Early career 
Spriggs was an assistant professor for two years at North Carolina Agricultural and Technical State University, where he taught introductory economics. He later moved to Norfolk State University, where he was the director of the honors program and an assistant professor of management for six years.

Organizational work and advocacy 
Spriggs left academia for some time to pursue research and advocacy, beginning with the Economic Policy Institute. There, he studied industrial relations, labor history, and the replacement of striking workers. Spriggs left the EPI in 1993 to join the Clinton administration as the director designate of the National Commission for Employment Policy. He advised politicians on training, education, reemployment, and the financing and development of HBCU. He also led the National Wage Record Database Design Project Report from 1993 to 1994.

He soon joined the Joint Economic Committee as a senior economist, serving the Senate minority (then the Democrats). He specifically advised Congressmen Kweisi Mfume, Pete Stark, and Jeff Bingaman. He continued serving in federal roles throughout the Clinton administration, including tenures in the U.S. Department of Commerce Economics and Statistics Administration and the U.S. Small Business Administration's Office of Government Contracting and Minority Business Development.

Spriggs left the Clinton administration in 1998 to join the Institute for Opportunity and Equality League as its executive director and advocate for research, advocacy and progressive public policy. He stayed for six years, working with fellow civil rights activists Maya Rockeymoore, Cheryl Hill Lee, Valerie Wilson, Hugh Price, Dorothy Height, Joseph Lowery, Norman Hill, and Bill Lucy. Spriggs later returned to the Economic Policy Institute before joining Howard University in 2005 as the chair of the economics department. He concurrently served as a senior fellow for the Community Service Society of New York and board chair of the UAW Retirees of the Dana Corp, Healthcare Trust for UAW Retirees of Ford Motor Company, and board member of the Retirement Healthcare Administration Corporation.

Support of Barack Obama and assistant secretary of labor 
Spriggs is a longtime supporter of Barack Obama, both during the latter's bid for presidency and after while serving on the 2008 Obama-Biden transition team. He specifically endorsed then presidential-nominee Obama's plan to focus on the alternative energy sector for new jobs. He also, along with dozens of other economists, endorsed the Employee Free Choice Act in early-2009. While the bill passed the House, it stalled in the Senate.

The Obama administration nominated Spriggs for the position of assistant secretary of policy in the Department of Labor in June 2009. Spriggs was easily approved by a voice vote of the full Senate on October 21, 2009. As the secretary of policy, Spriggs continued to argue for organized labor and increased support for the middle class. He represented America at the G-20 Labor Ministerial meeting in Guadalajara, Mexico and headed the U.S. delegation to the 101st International Labour Conference of the International Labour Organization in Switzerland.

Return to academia  
In 2012, Spriggs returned to his role as professor of economics at Howard University. He also accepted the position of chief economist for the AFL-CIO; through this role, he joined the board of the National Bureau of Economic Research (NBER).

Open letter to economists

In June 2020, Spriggs released an open letter to economists in the wake of the murder of George Floyd and subsequent protests. In his letter, Spriggs called on economists to recognize the racist roots of most explorations of racial disparities in economics. He argued that models of disparities between White and Black Americans based on differences in human capital accumulation frequently recognize the existence of racist discrimination in schooling and housing, but then assume this same discrimination does not exist in employment relationships. Spriggs discusses how models of statistical discrimination in economic outcomes between races assume away history, laws, and social norms, and even the way that racial categories are themselves the product of this history. In addition, he argued that models of disparities that assume inherent African American inferiority are a constant microaggression for African American economists and expressed frustration that many White economists are ignorant of work done by Black economists on these same topics. Spriggs calls on economists who use race in their work to better understand the ways that history and policy have shaped racial categories and focus on studying big questions about the institutions that shape economic outcomes. The letter received a great deal of media coverage, with Spriggs invited to lengthy interviews by multiple major publications.

Honors

Professional awards 
Robert M. Ball Award, National Academy of Social Insurance, 2016
Benjamin L. Hooks “Keeper of the Flame” Award, NAACP, 2014
Chairman's Award, Congressional Black Caucus, 2003
National Economics Association Dissertation Award, 1985
National Science Foundation Minority Graduate Fellow, 1979-1984

Other 
Bicentennial Award, Williams College, 2010
Harold Graves Essay Prize (University of Wisconsin-Madison, Department of Economics) 1980

Selected works

Books and book chapters 

 “A Look at Inequality, Workers’ Rights, and Race,” Law & Inequality, Vol. 36 (Number 2, 2018): 61-75.
 “Institutions to Remedy the New Inequality,” in Thomas I. Palley and Gustv A. Horn (eds.) Restoring Shared Prosperity: A Policy Agenda from Leading Keynesian Economists (Washington, DC, 2013).
 “The Changing Face of Poverty in America,” in Margaret Roush (ed.), U.S. National Debate Topic 2009-2010: Social Services for the Poor (H.W. Wilson, Co.: New York, 2009). 
 “African Americans and Social Security,” in Daniel Fireside, John Miller, Bryan Snyder (eds.), Real World Macro, 25th Edition (Economic Affairs Bureau, Inc.: Boston, 2008). 
 "Black Liberalism." International Encyclopedia of the Social Sciences, 2nd edition, William A. Darity, Jr. (ed.), (Macmillan Reference USA: Detroit, 2008). 
 “Participatory Democracy and Race Relations in the U.S.,” in Claire Nelson and Stacy RichardsKennedy (eds.) Advancing Equity in Latin America: Putting Policy into Practice (Inter American Development Bank: Washington, 2007). 
 “Social Security and American Values,” in Calvin Logue, Lynn Messina and Jean DeHart (eds.), Representative American Speeches, 2004-2005 (New York, NY: HW Wilson Company, 2005). 
 With Rhonda M. Williams, “What Do We Need to Explain About African American Unemployment,” in Robert Cherry and William M. Rodgers, III (eds.), Prosperity for All? The Economic Boom and African Americans (New York: Russell Sage, 2000): 188–207. 
 With Samuel L. Myers, Jr., “Black Employment, Criminal Activity and Entrepreneurship: A Case Study of New Jersey,” in Patrick L. Mason and Rhonda M. Williams (eds.), Race, Markets and Social Outcomes (Norwell, MA: Kluwer Academic Publishers, 1996): 31–64. 
 With John Schmitt, “The Minimum Wage: Blocking the Low-Wage Path,” in Todd Schaefer and Jeff Faux (eds.) Reclaiming Prosperity: A Blueprint for Progressive Economic Reform, (Armonk, NY: M. E. Sharpe, 1996): 163–172.

Publications 

 von Lockette, N.D., Spriggs, W.E. Wage Dynamics and Racial and Ethnic Occupational Segregation Among Less-Educated Men in Metropolitan Labor Markets. Rev Black Polit Econ 43, 35–56 (2016).
 Price, G.N., Spriggs, W. & Swinton, O.H. The Relative Returns to Graduating from a Historically Black College/University: Propensity Score Matching Estimates from the National Survey of Black Americans. Rev Black Polit Econ 38, 103–130 (2011).
 William M. Rodgers, III, William E. Spriggs, and Bruce W. Klein. "Do the Skills of Adults Employed in Minimum Wage Contour Jobs Explain Why They Get Paid Less?" Journal of Post Keynesian Economics 27, no. 1 (2004): 37–66.
 Rodgers, William M., and William E. Spriggs. "What does the AFQT really measure: Race, wages, schooling and the AFQT score." The Review of Black Political Economy 24, no. 4 (1996): 13–46.
 Maxwell, Nan L. "The Effect on Black-White Wage Differences of Differences in the Quantity and Quality of Education." Industrial and Labor Relations Review 47, no. 2 (1994): 249–64. doi:10.2307/2524419.
 Spriggs, William E. "Changes in the Federal Minimum Wage: A Test of Wage Norms." Journal of Post Keynesian Economics 16, no. 2 (1993): 221–39.
 Spriggs, William E. and Stanford, James (1993) "Economists' Assessments of the Likely Employment and Wage Effects of the North American Free Trade Agreement," Hofstra Labor & Employment Law Journal: Vol. 10 : Iss. 2, Article 3.
 Spriggs, William. "Measuring Residential Segregation: An Application of Trend Surface Analysis." Phylon 45, no. 4 (1984): 249–63. doi:10.2307/274906.

Congressional and federal testimonies

 “Trends in the U.S. Labor Market: Americans need a Raise” 115th Congress, 2nd Session. Subcommittee on Health, Employment, Labor and Pensions, Hearing, Growth, Opportunity, and Change in the U.S. Labor Market and the American Workforce: A Review of Current Developments, Trends, and Statistics (June 21, 2018).
 “A Mandate for Full Employment,” U.S. Congress. House of Representatives. 115th Congress, 1st Session. Subcommittee on Monetary Policy and Trade, Hearing, Examining the Federal Reserve's Mandate and Governance Structure (April 4, 2017).
 “Growth from Shared Prosperity: Americans need a Raise,” U.S. Congress. Senate. 115th Congress, 1st Session. Committee on Banking, Housing and Urban Affairs Hearing, Fostering Economic Growth: The Role of Financial Companies (March 28, 2017).
 “Government support of middle income America: Americans need a Raise,” U.S. Congress. House of Representatives. 114th Congress, 2nd Session. Committee on the Budget Hearing, Restoring the Trust for Families and Working-Age Americans (September 21, 2016).
 “Diversity and Balance in Federal Reserve Leadership,” U.S. Congress. House of Representatives. 114th Congress, 2nd Session. Subcommittee on Monetary Policy and Trade of the Financial Services Committee, Federal Reserve Districts: Governance, Monetary Policy, and Economic Performance (September 7, 2016).
 “Testimony for Hearing on “Help Wanted: Seasonal Employment Needs of Small Businesses,” U.S. Congress. House of Representatives. 113th Congress, 1st Session. Committee on Small Business, Subcommittee on Economic Growth, Tax and Capital Access, Help Wanted: Seasonal Employment Needs of Small Businesses (June 2013).
 “Concerns with the President’s Proposed Cut in Funding for Community Social Service Block Grants,” U.S. Congress. House of Representatives. 110th Congress, 2nd Session. Committee on Appropriations, Subcommittee Labor, Health and Human Services, and Education, Opportunities Lost and Costs to Society: The Social and Economic Burden of Inadequate Education, Training and Workforce Development (February 2008).
 “Testimony on H.R. 750: ‘Save America Comprehensive Immigration Act of 2007’,” U.S. Congress. House of Representatives. 110th Congress, 1st Session. Committee on the Judiciary, Subcommittee on Immigration, Citizenship, Refugees, Border Security, and International Law Hearing on H.R. 750, Save America Comprehensive Immigration Act of 2007 (November 2007).
 “Testimony Before the House Committee on Ways and Means,” U.S. Congress. House of Representatives. 110th Congress, 1st Session. Committee on Ways and Means. Hearing on the U.S. Economy (January 2007).
 “Concerns about the Program Oversight of GSE Housing Programs.” U.S. Congress. House of Representatives. 108th Congress. 1st Session. Committee on Financial Services. Hearing on H.R. 2575,The Secondary Mortgage Market Enterprises Regulatory Improvement Act (September 2003).
 “Concerns about the Transparency of Credit Scores.” U.S. Congress. House of Representatives. 108th Congress. 1st Session. Committee on Financial Services. Hearing on H.R. 2622, the Fair and Accurate Credit Transaction Act of 2003 (July 2003).
 “Concerns about Collateral Costs of Tax Exemption for Individual Dividend Income.” U.S. Congress. House of Representatives. 108th Congress. 1st Session. Subcommittee on Oversight and Investigations, Committee on Financial Services. Paying Dividends: How the President's Tax Plan Will Benefit Individual Investors and Strengthen the Capital Markets (March 2003).
 “Statement,” U.S. Congress. House of Representatives. 106th Congress. 1st Session. Subcommittee on Social Security, Impacts of the Current Social Security System (February, 1999).
 "Worker Rights and U.S. Trade Policy," U.S. Congress. Senate. 103rd Congress. 1st Session. Subcommittee on Foreign Commerce and Tourism, U.S. Competitiveness in the Global Marketplace (May, 1993).
 "Shifting Patterns of North American Manufacturing Job Creation: The Period from Mexican Investment Liberalization to U.S. Recession (1986-1990)," U.S. Congress. Senate. 102nd Congress. 2nd Session. Subcommittee on Labor, NAFTA: The Hidden Costs of "Free" Trade (October, 1992).
 "Potential Effects of Direct Foreign Investment Shifts Due to the Proposed U.S.-Mexico Free Trade Agreement," U.S. Congress. House of Representatives. 102nd Congress. 1st Session. Subcommittee on Commerce, Consumer Protection, and Competitiveness, North American Free Trade Agreement (March and May, 1991).

References

External links 
 William Spriggs on NPR
 William Spriggs' profile at Howard University
 William Spriggs' Twitter (personal)
 

African-American economists
Howard University faculty
United States Department of Labor officials
University of Wisconsin–Madison College of Letters and Science alumni
Williams College alumni
Norfolk State University faculty
Labor economists
Academics from Washington, D.C.
Economists from Washington, D.C.
21st-century  American economists
Living people
1955 births
Presidents of the National Economic Association
21st-century African-American people
20th-century African-American people
20th-century  American economists